Argun may refer to:
Argun (surname)
Argun, Iran, a village in East Azerbaijan Province, Iran
Argun Urban Okrug, a municipal formation which the town of republic significance of Argun in the Chechen Republic, Russia is incorporated as
Argun, Russia, several inhabited localities in Russia
Argun (Caucasus), a river in Georgia and southern Russia
Argun (Amur), a river in far eastern Russia and northeastern China
Medemia argun, flowering plant in the family Arecaceae

See also
 Arghun (c. 1258–1291), or Argun, ruler of the Mongol empire's Ilkhanate
 Arghun Aqa (before 1242–1278), Mongol noble
 Urgun, a town in Paktika Province, Afghanistan
 Argyn, a clan within the Kazakh ethnicity